The 59th season of the Campeonato Gaúcho kicked off on March 7, 1979, and ended on December 16, 1979. Twenty teams participated. Grêmio won their 21st title. 14 de Julho de Passo Fundo and Cachoeira were relegated.

Participating teams

System 
The championship would have four stages.:

 First phase: The twenty clubs played each other in a double round-robin system. The eight best teams qualified to the Final phase, with the best teams in each round and the team with the best overall record earning one bonus point. the other teams in the sum of both rounds would dispute the Torneio de Descenso.
 Torneio de Descenso: The twelve teams would be divided into two groups of six teams, in which each team played the teams if its own group in a double round-robin system. The team with the fewest points in each group would qualify to the Torneio da Morte.
 Torneio da Morte: Played in two-legged knockout ties. In the Semifinals, the two teams from the Torneio de Descenso would play each other, with the loser being relegated, and in the Finals, the winner of the Semifinals would play against the runners-up of the Second level, with the winner qualifying to the First level.
 Final phase: The eight remaining teams played each other in a double round-robin system; the team with the most points won the title.

Championship

First phase

First round

Second round

Final standings

Extra point playoff

Torneio de Descenso

Group A

Group B

Torneio da Morte 

Key: * = Play-off winners, (a) = Wins because of away goals rule, (e) = Wins after extra time in second leg, (p) = Wins after penalty shoot-out.

Semifinals 

Cachoeira advances; 14 de Julho de Passo Fundo relegated

Finals 

14 de Julho de Santana do Livramento promoted; Cachoeira relegated

Final phase

References 

Campeonato Gaúcho seasons
Gaúcho